The Rosalie Plantation Sugar Mill is located in Rapides Parish, Louisiana near Alexandria, Louisiana.  It was listed on the National Register of Historic Places in 1976.

It is a one-story  stepped gable brick building, built by slave labor for owner Gervais Ballio in about 1847.

It is located south of Alexandria off U.S. 71/U.S. 167.

References

Industrial buildings completed in 1847
Buildings and structures in Alexandria, Louisiana
Industrial buildings and structures on the National Register of Historic Places in Louisiana
1847 establishments in Louisiana
National Register of Historic Places in Rapides Parish, Louisiana
Sugar refineries